Cavatore is a comune (municipality) in the Province of Alessandria in the Italian region Piedmont, located about  southeast of Turin and about  southwest of Alessandria.

Cavatore borders the following municipalities: Acqui Terme, Cartosio, Grognardo, Melazzo, and Ponzone.

Demographic evolution

References

Cities and towns in Piedmont